Coptoprepes is a genus of South American anyphaenid sac spiders first described by Eugène Simon in 1884.

Species
 it contains twelve species:
Coptoprepes bellavista Werenkraut & Ramírez, 2009 – Chile
Coptoprepes campanensis Ramírez, 2003 – Chile
Coptoprepes casablanca Werenkraut & Ramírez, 2009 – Chile, Argentina
Coptoprepes contulmo Werenkraut & Ramírez, 2009 – Chile
Coptoprepes ecotono Werenkraut & Ramírez, 2009 – Chile, Argentina
Coptoprepes eden Werenkraut & Ramírez, 2009 – Chile
Coptoprepes flavopilosus Simon, 1884 – Chile, Argentina
Coptoprepes laudani Barone, Werenkraut  & Ramírez, 2016 – Chile, Argentina
Coptoprepes nahuelbuta Ramírez, 2003 – Chile
Coptoprepes recinto Werenkraut & Ramírez, 2009 – Chile
Coptoprepes valdiviensis Ramírez, 2003 – Chile, Argentina
Coptoprepes variegatus Mello-Leitão, 1940 – Argentina

References

Anyphaenidae
Araneomorphae genera
Spiders of South America
Taxa named by Eugène Simon